Ishema Party is a Rwandan political movement founded by Rev. Father Thomas Nahimana and other young Rwandan activists and scholars. Among these, we can recall Mrs Nadine Claire KASINGE, Mr Chaste GAHUNDE, Mr Venant NKURUNZIZA, inter alia. They all met in Paris and for three days, they exchanged on issues facing Rwanda and possible consequences. In conclusion, they decided to start a new political party. That is how Ishema Party was born.

History
The Ishema party was founded in Paris, France on 28 January 2013.

The vision set by the founders is "promoting Democracy through the truth, intrepidness and social justice". From the beginning they proposed non-violence and peace, based on dialogue and consensus upon the constructive initiatives to be implemented in a manner evenly beneficial to all the citizens. This mean that every Umutaripfana should stand for the Truth, Intrepidness and Social Justice.

On 8 February 2014 the Ishema Party convened its first Congress and decided that the time had come to go back home and realise their political program as resumed in their main society project named "Together to Modernise Rwanda". It was in this Congress that Rev. Father Thomas Nahimana was nominated as the presidential candidate in the elections of 2017.

However, the Ishema Party leaders were not able to realise their project after attempting twice to go back to their home country; they were denied their right by the Government of Rwanda which is currently led by Paul Kagame and the Rwandan Patriotic Front.

After consultation with other members of Rwanda opposition in exile, members of Civil Society, and some personal individuals, they decided to found a Government of Rwanda in Exile and the idea was realised on 20 February 2017. Rev Father Thomas Nahimana  became President of the Republic and Mr Abdullah Akishuri became Prime Minister. There were also 12 other Ministers of the Cabinet.

Members of the Ishema Party are called "Abataripfana" meaning "Brave people who can never stop saying the truth no matter what".

leprophète.fr
Nahima and others created a party online newspaper, leprophète.fr, to present their political views. The Rwandan government condemned the paper as dangerous.

Father Thomas Nahimana 

Father Thomas Nahimana was a priest in Cyangugu diocese, in southwestern Rwanda.  He fled the country in 2005 and has been living in France.  He holds dual Rwandan and French citizenship.

Nahimana, in common with Victoire Ingabire Umuhoza and other opponents of the RFP (Rwandan Patriotic Front), is accused of being a genocide denier from comments he has made while abroad and could face charges and years of imprisonment. Nahima also briefly sought to join his efforts with the Democratic Forces for the Liberation of Rwanda (FDRL), but was rejected.

2017 presidential election
On January 22, 2017, Father Nahimana Thomas, the leader of the Ishema party, attempted to return to Rwanda to run for the presidency in the August elections. He would be the sole opponent against Paul Kagame, who will run for a third term after the Rwandan Constitution was changed to allow a third term.   Once again Nahimana was denied entry to Rwanda by the Rwandan Directorate of Immigration on the basis of a series of complex passport and visa issues.

References

Political parties in Rwanda